Urmia (electoral district) is a biggest electoral district in the West Azerbaijan Province of Iran. This electoral district has a population of 936,738 and elects 3 members of parliament. Urmia elections on the basis of ethnicity and religion.

1980
MPs in 1980 from the electorate of Urmia. (1st)
 Gholamreza Hassani (Az, Resigned)
 Ali Hagigat Afshar (Az)
 Hassan Vaez Mousavi-Anzabi (Az)
 Akbar Ghaffari (Az, Mid-term elections)

1984
MPs in 1984 from the electorate of Urmia. (2nd)
 Mohammad-Ali Sehabazzamani (Az)
 Ali Abdolalizadeh (Az)
 Ali Kamyar (Az)

1988
MPs in 1988 from the electorate of Urmia. (3rd)
 Ali Abdolalizadeh (Az)
 Ali Kamyar (Az)
 Beitollah Jafari (Az)

1992
MPs in 1992 from the electorate of Urmia. (4th)
 Ali Kamyar (Az)
 Beitollah Jafari (Az)
 Nosrat Samadzadeh (Az)

1996
MPs in 1996 from the electorate of Urmia. (5th)
 Mohsen Khadem-Arabbaghi (Az)
 Alireza Ghanizadeh (Az)
 Shahrbanoo Amani (Az)

2000
MPs in 2000 from the electorate of Urmia. (6th)
 Mahmud Yeghanli (Az)
 Karim Fattahpour (ku)
 Shahrbanoo Amani (Az)

2004
MPs in 2004 from the electorate of Urmia. (7th)
 Mohammad Abbaspour (Az)
 Javad Jahanghirzadeh (Az)
 Abed Fattahi (Ku)

2008
MPs in 2008 from the electorate of Urmia. (8th)
 Nader Ghazipour (Az)
 Javad Jahanghirzadeh (Az)
 Salman Zaker (Az)

2012
MPs in 2012 from the electorate of Urmia. (9th)
 Nader Ghazipour (Az)
 Javad Jahanghirzadeh (Az)
 Abed Fattahi (Ku)

2016

Notes

References

Electoral districts of West Azerbaijan
Urmia County
Deputies of Urmia